13 is the 13th studio album by the French band Indochine, mixed by Mick Guzauski and released on 8 September 2017. The album topped the French, Swiss and Belgian French (Wallonia) charts.

The band promoted the album with the 13 Tour.

Track listing
"Black Sky" – 6:26
"2033" – 4:06
"Station 13" – 6:18
"Henry Darger" – 5:28
"La vie est belle" – 5:27
"Kimono dans l'ambulance" – 5:51
"Karma Girls" – 6:32
"Suffragettes BB" – 5:56
"Un été français" – 5:26
"TomBoy 1" (featuring Kiddy Smile) – 6:14
"Song for a Dream" – 5:33
"Cartagène" – 6:32
"Gloria" (featuring Asia Argento) – 7:08

Bonus tracks on deluxe edition
"Trump le monde" – 6:09
"La 13ème vague" – 4:59
"Station 13" (Long version) – 8:06
"Tomboy 2" – 6:01
"Henry Darger" (John Digweed & Nick Muir Remix) – 5:23
"Un été français" (Joachim Garraud Remix) – 5:09
"Station 13" (Vitalic Remix) – 6:12
"Station 13" (Talisco Remix) – 4:43

Musicians 
 Nicola Sirkis : Vocals, piano, guitar, Bass, Synthesizers
 Oli De Sat : Piano, guitar, Bass, synth, backing vocals
 Boris: Guitar
 Marc : Bass
 Ludwig : Drums

Charts

Weekly charts

Year-end charts

Certifications

References

2017 albums
Indochine (band) albums